Up the Road with Sallie is a surviving 1918 silent film comedy-romance directed by William Desmond Taylor and starring Constance Talmadge. It was produced by Lewis J. Selznick and released through his Select Picture Corporation. It is preserved in the UCLA Film and Television Archive.

Cast
Constance Talmadge - Sallie Waters
Norman Kerry - Joshua Cabot II, alias Smith Jones
Kate Toncray - Martha Cabot
Thomas Persse - John Henderson, alias John Johnson
Karl Formes - Judge Joshua Cabot
M. B. Paanakker - Richard Cabot

Critical appraisal

Up the Road With Sallie is “typical of many unpretentious but entertaining features” that in the silent era ran about an hour (typically of 4-or 5-reel productions). Film historian Charles Hopkins of the UCLA Film and Television Archive remarks:

Footnotes

Sources
Hopkins, Charles. Up the Road with Sallie, 1916. UCLA Film and Television Archive: 12th Festival of Preservation, July 22-August 21, 2004. Festival guest handbook.

External links

 Up the Road with Sallie at IMDb.com

a couple of lobby cards(archived)

1918 films
Films directed by William Desmond Taylor
American silent feature films
American black-and-white films
American romantic comedy films
1918 romantic comedy films
Selznick Pictures films
1910s American films
Silent romantic comedy films
Silent American comedy films
1910s English-language films